The Great Mosque of Hohhot is a mosque in Huimin District, Hohhot, Inner Mongolia, China. It is the oldest and largest mosque in Inner Mongolia.

History
The mosque was constructed in 1693 by the Hui people. It was then renovated in 1789 and 1923.

Architecture
The mosque was designed with the Chinese and Arabic architecture and built with black bricks. It covers an area of 4,000 m2. It has one minaret with a height of 15 meters and a public bath.

See also
 Islam in China
 List of mosques in China

References

1693 establishments in China
Buildings and structures in Hohhot
Mosques completed in 1693
Mosques in China